The 2011 Esso Cup was Canada's third annual national women's midget hockey championship, played April 17–23, 2011 at the Servus Credit Union Place in St. Albert, Alberta. The Notre Dame Hounds defeated the Edmonton Thunder 5-2 in the gold medal game to win their first Esso Cup title. Edmonton goaltender Morgan Glover was named the tournament's most valuable player.

Teams

Round robin

Standings

Scores

 Lac St-Louis 5 - Kings County 0
 Edmonton 3 - Notre Dame 2 (SO)
 St. Albert 4 - Toronto 3 (SO)
 Notre Dame 6 - Lac St-Louis 0
 Edmonton 4 - Toronto 2
 St. Albert 5 - Kings County 0
 Toronto 5 - Lac St-Louis 1
 Notre Dame 14 - Kings County 0
 Edmonton 1 - St. Albert 0
 Toronto 9 - Kings County 2
 Edmonton 2 - Lac St-Louis 1
 Notre Dame 4 - St. Albert 3 (SO)
 Edmonton 10 - Kings County 0
 Notre Dame 3 - Toronto 1
 Lac St-Louis 4 - St. Albert 2

Playoffs

Semi-finals
 Notre Dame 5 - Toronto 1
 Edmonton 4 - Lac St-Louis 1

Bronze-medal game
 Toronto 4 - Lac St-Louis 0

Gold-medal game
 Notre Dame 5 - Edmonton 2

Individual awards
 Most Valuable Player: Morgan Glover (Edmonton)
 Top Scorer: Olivia Howe (Notre Dame)
 Top Forward: Olivia Howe (Notre Dame)
 Top Defenceman: Emma Korbs (Toronto)
 Top Goaltender: Morgan Glover (Edmonton)
 Most Sportsmanlike Player: Matana Skoye (St. Albert)

Road to the Esso Cup

Atlantic Region
Regional Tournament held March 31-April 3, 2011 at Montague, Prince Edward Island

Round robin

Championship Game
 Kings County 3 - Bathurst 1
Kings County advances to Esso Cup

Quebec
Dodge Cup Midget Championship held March 31-April 3, 2011 at Kirkland, Quebec

Quarter-finals
 Pionnières de Laurentides-Lanaudière 3 - Abitibi-Témiscamingue 1
 Kodiacs du Lac St-Louis 4 - Rapides de l'Estrie 1
 L'Express de l'Outaouais 3 - Rebelles de Laval 0
 Remparts du Richelieu 3 - Rafales de la Mauricie 0

Semi-finals
 Remparts du Richelieu 5 - Pionnières de Laurentides-Lanaudière 0
 Kodiacs du Lac St-Louis 1 - L'Express de l'Outaouais 0

Championship Game
 Kodiacs du Lac St-Louis 2 - Remparts du Richelieu 0
Lac St-Louis wins Dodge Cup and advances to Esso Cup

Ontario
Ontario Women's Hockey Association Championship held February 18–20, 2011 at Brampton, Ontario

Quarter-finals
 Stoney Creek 1 - Whitby 0
 Toronto 4 - Kingston 0
 Kanata 2 - Sarnia 0
 Thunder Bay 3 - Belleville 1

Semi-finals
 Thunder Bay 3 - Stoney Creek 0
 Toronto 5 - Kanata 2

Championship Game
 Toronto 4 - Thunder Bay 2
Toronto wins championship and advances to Esso Cup

Western Region
Best-of-3 series played April 1–3, 2011 at Morden, Manitoba
Notre Dame Hounds vs Pembina Valley Hawks
 Game 1: Notre Dame 3 - Pembina Valley 1
 Game 2: Notre Dame 4 - Pembina Valley 1
Notre Dame wins series and advances to Esso Cup

Pacific Region
Best-of-3 series played April 1–3, 2011 at Edmonton, Alberta
Thompson-Okanagan Rockets vs Edmonton Thunder
 Game 1: Edmonton 4 - Thompson-Okanagan 1
 Game 2: Edmonton 8 - Thompson-Okanagan 1
Edmonton wins series and advances to Esso Cup

See also
 Esso Cup

References

External links
 2011 Esso Cup Home Page at HockeyCanada.com
 Hockey Canada-Esso Cup Guide and Record Book
 Road to the 2011 Esso Cup

Esso Cup
Esso Cup
Sport in St. Albert, Alberta